The 1985 Soviet football championship was the 54th seasons of competitive football in the Soviet Union. Dinamo Kiev won the Top League championship becoming the Soviet domestic champions for the eleventh time.

Honours

Notes = Number in parentheses is the times that club has won that honour. * indicates new record for competition

Soviet Union football championship

Top League

 For the following season the League was reduced to 16 members. The teams that finished 15th and 16th played a mini-tournament with the two best out of the Soviet First League. Out of this tournament the two best teams continued on in the Soviet Top League.

 For the 1986 season there was no promotion out of the Soviet First League.

First League

For places 1–12

For places 13–22

Playoffs
Group A

Group B

Group V

Second League

Group 1

Group 2

Group 3

Group 4

Group 5

Group 6

 For places 1-14

Group 7

Group 8
 For places 1-6

Group 9

Top goalscorers

Top League
 Oleh Protasov (Dnepr Dneprpetrovsk) – 35 goals

First League
Valeriy Shmarov (CSKA Moscow) – 29 goals

References

External links
 1985 Soviet football championship. RSSSF